Chal Tike Dusta Heba is a 2019 Odia language film co-written and directed by Tapas Sargharia. The screenplay is written by Debidutta Mohanty. The film stars Mahima, Sayal and Rishan are in lead roles. The film is a teenage love story.

Cast
 Rishan as Rishan
 Mahima as Annie
 Sayal as Sakshi Sasmal
 Mihir Das as Binayak/Mr.Bin (Rishan's Dad)
 Priyanka Mahapatra as Rishan's Mother
 Pradyumna Lenka as Sakshi's Dad
 Tribhuban Panda as Ghanta
 Aiswarya Behera as Aiswarya Ma'am (Teacher)
 Bhoomika Dash as Herself (Cameo)
 Saroj as Principal Sir
 Siba Prasad as Rishan's Friend
 Ashish Champaty as Rishan's friend
Siddhartha as Rishan's Friend

Plot
Rishan and Annie are teenagers fall in love with each other.

Music

Music composed by Bibhuti Bhusan Garnaik. The soundtrack was released by Tarang Music.

Release
The film was released on 11 January 2019 in theatres all over Odisha and it is the 18th movie to be released under the banner of Tarang Cine Productions.

References

2010s Odia-language films
Films directed by Tapas Sargharia